KNMI may refer to:

 KNMI (FM), a radio station (88.9 FM) licensed to Farmington, New Mexico, United States
 Royal Netherlands Meteorological Institute (Dutch abbreviation: KNMI)